Blighia is a genus of four species of flowering plants in the soapberry family, Sapindaceae, native to tropical Africa from Guinea east to Kenya. The fruit is partly edible, with the Ackee (B. sapida) being grown commercially for fruit production. The genus is named for Captain William Bligh (formerly of ), who brought samples back to England.

The flowers are produced in small panicles.

Selected species

 Blighia sapida - Ackee
 Blighia unijugata
 Blighia welwitschii

References

Sapindaceae genera
Sapindaceae
Taxa named by Charles Konig